Spodnji Duplek is a settlement and the administrative centre of the Municipality of Duplek in northeastern Slovenia. It lies on the left bank of the Drava River southeast of Maribor. The area is part of the traditional region of Styria. The municipality is now included in the Drava Statistical Region.

A Neo-Baroque chapel-shrine with a belfry at the crossroads in the centre of the settlement dates to 1860.

References

External links
Spodnji Duplek at Geopedia

Populated places in the Municipality of Duplek